The Sumner Tunnel is a road tunnel in Boston, Massachusetts, United States. It carries traffic under Boston Harbor in one direction, from Logan International Airport and Route 1A in East Boston. The tunnel originally deposited traffic at the west side of the North End, but with the completion of the Big Dig, it was modified to have two exits. One exit connects to I-93 northbound and downtown Boston (Government Center) near Haymarket Station. The other exit connects to Storrow Drive and Nashua St., connecting Cambridge via Route 28. Traffic headed for I-93 southbound and the Massachusetts Turnpike (I-90) westbound is normally routed to the Ted Williams Tunnel.

History
The Sumner Tunnel was opened on June 30, 1934. It carried traffic in both directions until the opening of the parallel Callahan Tunnel in 1961. The Sumner Tunnel is named for William H. Sumner, the son of Governor Increase Sumner.

, a toll of $1.50 is charged for non-commercial two-axle vehicles with a Massachusetts E-ZPass, while non-Massachusetts E-ZPass holders are charged $1.75. Vehicles without E-ZPass are charged $2.05 through MassDOT's Pay by Plate MA program. For residents of certain Boston ZIP Codes, a discount is in effect using an E-ZPass transponder, costing $0.20. On November 14, 2008, the Massachusetts Turnpike Authority voted in favor of a proposed toll hike which would double the toll to $7.00 for non-commercial vehicles (at the time, the toll was $3.50 in the southbound direction only). E-ZPass users would receive a $1.00 discount and commercial vehicles would end up having to pay $9.00. This vote was later rescinded following a vote approving a 1.25% sales tax increase.

In 2016, cashless tolling systems were installed in both directions, entering the Sumner Tunnel and exiting the Callahan Tunnel as part of a plan to modernize toll collection in the Boston area.

Shutdowns are planned for weekends starting June 2022, with a full shutdown for the summer of 2023 and intermittent closures into 2024, to allow a complete rehabilitation of the tunnel.

See also
 Ted Williams Tunnel
 Thomas P. O'Neill Jr. Tunnel
 Callahan Tunnel
 Zakim Bunker Hill Bridge
 Massachusetts Turnpike
 Big Dig (Boston, Massachusetts)

References

External links
 Sumner Tunnel construction photographs, 1929-1933, University Archives and Special Collections, Joseph P. Healey Library, University of Massachusetts Boston

Boston Harbor
Tunnels in Boston
Toll tunnels in Massachusetts
U.S. Route 1
Interstate 93
Tunnels completed in 1934
Road tunnels in Massachusetts
1934 establishments in Massachusetts